Festuca djimilensis is a species of grass in the family Poaceae. This species is native to North Caucasus, Transcaucasus, and Turkey. Is perennial and prefers temperate biomes. Festuca djimilensis was first described in 1874.

References

djimilensis